Claude Fauchet may refer to:
 Claude Fauchet (historian) (1530–1602), French historian
 Claude Fauchet (revolutionist) (1744–1793), French bishop and revolutionist